Chester Emanuel "Chet" Falk (May 15, 1905; Austin, Texas – January 7, 1982; Austin, Texas), nicknamed "Spot", was an American Major League baseball player who pitched for the St. Louis Browns from 1925 to 1927.

References

1905 births
1982 deaths
Major League Baseball pitchers
St. Louis Browns players
Texas Longhorns baseball players
Baseball players from Austin, Texas